The Bosnia and Herzegovina national futsal team is controlled by the Football Association of Bosnia and Herzegovina, the governing body for futsal in Bosnia and Herzegovina and represents the country in international futsal competitions, such as the FIFA Futsal World Cup and the European Championships.

Tournament records

FIFA Futsal World Cup

UEFA European Futsal Championship

Mediterranean Futsal Cup

Current squad
The following players were called up to the squad for the UEFA Futsal Euro 2022 qualifying. All players played at least one of the six matches against Serbia, Romania and North Macedonia.

2015

Results and schedule
The box below, shows the results of all matches played in the recent past, and the scheduled matches in the near future.

Goalscorers

Fixtures

Coaching history
 Rade Kovač
 Tomislav Ćurčić (2008–2011)
 Murat Jaha (2011–2013)
 Boro Matan (2013–2018)
 Ivo Krezo (2018–present)

References

External links
SportSport
UEFA

European national futsal teams
Futsal in Bosnia and Herzegovina
futsal